Bjedugh, Bzhedug or Bazdug (Bjzədıuğ, ;) are one of the twelve major Circassian tribes. 

Many of them immigrated to Turkey in the 1860s, but there is still a community of Bzhedug on the left bank of the Kuban River (in the vicinity of Krasnodar). The Bzhedug people live in Adygea and Krasnodar Krai, and are well represented in the Adyghe (Circassian) diaspora in all countries of residence. Even in ancient times the Bzhedug people were divided into four tribes.

History
The Bzhedugs originally lived in the area of Shahe River, between Tuapse and Sochi. Later they divided in two groups: those who lived close to the Black Sea (Abhiaskis) and Adygeans (territory of Kuban River). This migration was causes by overpopulation and warlike neighbors to their Black Sea's territories. Bzhedug were subdivided into Chechenay tribe (Psekups River and Pshish River) and the Hamish tribe (Afips River and Psekups River). They were involved in cattle breeding and agriculture, growing mostly crops and corn.

Language

The Bzhedugs people speak a dialect (Bz̄edyğwbze) of the Adyghe language.

Bzhedug villages in Adigey

There are 48 Circassian villages in Republic of Adygea, 26 of which are Bzhedug villages (54% of the villages in Adygea).

See also
 Circassians#Tribes
 Shapsugs
 Abzakhs
 Zhaney
 Mamkhegh
 Natukhai
 Temirgoy
 Hatuqwai
 Besleney
 Circassian genocide

References

External links
Adyghe story in Bzhedug language 1
Adyghe story in Bzhedug language 2

History of Kuban
Ethnic groups in Russia
Circassian tribes
Adygea